China competed at the 2000 Summer Paralympics, held in Sydney, Australia.

Medal table

See also
China at the Paralympics
China at the 2000 Summer Olympics
Sports in China

References

External links
Sydney 2000 Press Release - IPC
International Paralympic Committee
National Paralympic Committee of China (NPCC) - short introduction

Nations at the 2000 Summer Paralympics
2000
Paralympics